Abdul Qayyum Khan (born November 1922) was a Pakistani field hockey player. He competed in the men's tournament at the 1948 Summer Olympics.

References

External links
 

1922 births
Possibly living people
Pakistani male field hockey players
Olympic field hockey players of Pakistan
Field hockey players at the 1948 Summer Olympics
Field hockey players from Delhi
Indian emigrants to Pakistan
20th-century Pakistani people